The 8th Asian Table Tennis Championships 1986 were held in Shenzhen, China, from 7 to 14 October 1986. It was organised by the Chinese Table Tennis Association under the authority of Asian Table Tennis Union (ATTU) and International Table Tennis Federation (ITTF).

Medal summary

Medal table

Events

See also
World Table Tennis Championships
Asian Cup

References

Asian Table Tennis Championships
Asian Table Tennis Championships
Table Tennis Championships
Table tennis competitions in China
Asian Table Tennis Championships
Asian Table Tennis Championships